Cincinnati Music Theatre is a community theatre company in Cincinnati, Ohio, dedicated to presenting full productions of old and new musicals with an entirely volunteer staff.

History
Started in 1963, founder Will Breyer contacted other musical theatre enthusiasts to join him in creating a new theatre devoted to helping nonprofessional actors. The original board Breyer constructed consisted of: Will Breyer, Doug Gray, Frank Longevin, Jean McDowell, John McDowell, Jane O'Reilly, and Joe O'Reilly.

The Cincinnati Music Theatre was originally named the Eastern Hills Music Theatre. Desiring a wider audience and a larger pool of actors to support, the fledgling theatre expanded into its modern state. The CMT hosts many performers, musicians, and production staff crews that come from southwest Ohio, northern Kentucky and other local areas.

Expanding further, the CMT moved to the Jarson-Kaplan Theatre of Aronoff Center for the Arts in 1995.

Volunteers
The Cincinnati Music Theatre prides itself in having a staff and crew composed entirely of volunteers. The volunteer nature of the Cincinnati Music Theatre is why the organization is registered as an IRS 501c(3) non-profit.
In order to coordinate volunteers, the CMT has a system of dues and patron levels.

Performances

References

External links
 Cincinnati Music Theatre

Theatre companies in Cincinnati
Music of Cincinnati